Trinity Springs is an unincorporated community in Mitcheltree Township, Martin County, in the U.S. state of Indiana.

History
Trinity Springs was originally known as Harrisonville, and under the latter name was platted in 1837. It is the site of three natural springs and was a popular tourist destination in the early 1900s; at one point, seven different hotels operated in the community. The town was briefly the county seat in the 1800s.

A post office was established at Trinity Springs in 1848, and remained in operation until it was discontinued in 1943.

A rock outcrop covered in historic graffiti and the remains of a historic swimming pool situated next to a natural sulphur spring are most of what is left of the resort, commemorated by a historic sign at Mustering Elm Park along State Road 450.

Geography

References

Unincorporated communities in Martin County, Indiana
Unincorporated communities in Indiana